Mirabilite, also known as Glauber's salt, is a hydrous sodium sulfate mineral with the chemical formula Na2SO4·10H2O. It is a vitreous, colorless to white monoclinic mineral that forms as an evaporite from sodium sulfate-bearing brines. It is found around saline springs and along saline playa lakes. Associated minerals include gypsum, halite, thenardite, trona, glauberite, and epsomite.

Mirabilite is unstable and quickly dehydrates in dry air, the prismatic crystals turning into a white powder, thenardite (Na2SO4). In turn, thenardite can also absorb water and converts to mirabilite.

Mirabilite is used as a purgative and anti-inflammatory remedy in the Traditional Chinese medicine; in Mandarin, it is called máng xiāo. The name 'mirabilite' is based on the phrase "Sal mirabilis" (Latin for "wonderful salt") used by Johann Rudolph Glauber when he inadvertently synthesized mirabilite.

Mirabilite is found in several areas within the Mammoth Cave system, where it appears to have been mined by Late Archaic and Early Woodland peoples, probably for use as a laxative.

Four mirabilite mounds were documented on the south shore of the Great Salt Lake, Utah, United States, in January 2020. These developed where springs surfaced along the beach, which had been exposed due to lower lake elevations, and cold air helped preserve the salt precipitate. This was documented by the Utah Geological Survey as well as reported in the press.

References

External links
Maricopa.edu
American Mineralogist (1917)
"Mirabilite as a tracer of past evolution of the Aral Sea"

Sodium minerals
Sulfate minerals
Evaporite
Monoclinic minerals
Minerals in space group 14
Industrial minerals